Hmar, also spelled as Mar, is an ethnic group living in Northeast Indian state of Manipur and Mizoram, western Myanmar (Burma) and eastern Bangladesh.

Population
According to the 2011 Indian Census, there were 98,988 Hmar speakers.

Manipur
In the 2011 census, there were 49,081 Hmars in Manipur.

Mizoram
The exact population of the Hmars in Mizoram is not known. In the first census of 1901 there were 10,411 Hmar language speakers. By 1961 the population was assessed to be 3,118, and then 4,524 in 1971. In the 2001 census, 18,155 Hmar speakers were found in Mizoram, but most of the Hmars of Mizoram speak Mizo languages.

Religion 

An overwhelming majority of the Hmar people practice Christianity.

Place of origin 

The majority of the Hmars were cultivators. The Hmars in South Manipur were introduced to Christianity in the year 1910 by Watkin Roberts, a Welsh missionary.

Political movements 

After the signing of the Mizo Accord in July 1986, some Hmar leaders in Mizoram formed the Mizoram Hmar Association (later renamed the Hmar People's Convention (HPC)). The HPC spearheaded a political movement for self-governance of the Hmars in Mizoram, demanding an Autonomous District Council (ADC) comprising Hmar-dominated areas in north and northwest of Mizoram for the protection of their identity, culture, tradition, language, and natural resources. 

To quell and suppress the political movement, the Mizoram government deployed the Mizoram Armed Police (MAP) against the HPC activists, which forced the HPC to take up an armed struggle by forming an armed wing, the Hmar Volunteer Cell (HVC). The armed confrontation continued until 1992 when HPC representatives and the Government of Mizoram mutually agreed to hold ministerial-level talks. After multiple rounds of talks, a Memorandum of Settlement (MoS) was signed in Aizawl on 27 July 1994 between the Government of Mizoram and the HPC. Armed cadres of the HPC surrendered along with their weapons in October 1994 and later the Sinlung Hills Development Council (SHDC) was established. Some of the HPC leaders and cadres, however, rejected the Memorandum of Settlement and broke away from the main HPC, forming the Hmar People's Convention - Democratic (HPC-D), which continued an armed movement for autonomy in the form of an Autonomous District Council under the Sixth Schedule to the Constitution of India within Mizoram. Over one hundred militants of HPC-D surrendered with their weapons in April 2018 following a peace pact signed with the Mizoram state government, which led to the formation of the Sinlung Hills Council

Literature 
 Dena, Lal; In search of identity: Hmars of North-East India; New Delhi 2008; 
 Allen BC, Gait EA, Allen CGH, and Howard HF. Gazetteer of Bengal and North East India. Mittal Publications. New Delhi 1979.
 Pudaite, Rochunga. 1963. The Education of the Hmar People. Sielmat, Churachandpur. Indo-Burma Pioneer Mission, 1963.
 Songate, H. 1956. Hmar History-Hmar Chanchin. Imphal: Mao Press.
 Songate, H. 1967. Hmar Chanchin (Hmar History).Churachandpur: L & R Press.
 Pakhuongte, Ruolneikhum. 1983. The Power of the Gospel Among the Hmar Tribe. Shillong, Meghalaya: EFCI. Ri Khasi Press, Shillong.
 Bapui, VLT & Buruah, PN Dutta. 1996. Hmar Grammar. Mysore: Central Institute of Indian Languages. CIIL Press, Mysore.
 Bapui, Vanlal Tluonga. 2012. Hmar Ṭawng Inchukna (A Lexical Study of the Hmar Language & Usages). Guwahati, Assam: The Assam Institute of Research for Tribals and Scheduled Castes. Hi-Tech Printing & Binding Industries, Guwahati
 Cassar, T. 2013. Only 36,000. 
 Cassar, T. 2017. Oh God - Now it's 75K (and it's only getting worse)!. 
 Dena, Lal. 1995. Hmar Folk Tales. New Delhi: Scholar Publishing House. Bengal Printing Press, New Delhi 
 Fimate, L. Thina Râpthlak.
 Hmar, RH Hminglien. 1997. Hmangaitu Hmel.
 Hminga, FT. 1991. Hmar Pipu Thilhming Lo Phuokhai. Churachandpur, Manipur: Dr. FT Hminga.
 Hminga, FT. 1993. Hmar Ṭawng Indiklem. Churachandpur, Manipur: Dr. FT Hminga.
 Hminga, FT. 1994. Hming Umzie Neihai. Churachandpur, Manipur: Dr. FT Hminga.
 Hrangate, HC. 1996. Pathien Kut.
 Lalhmuoklien, 2009. Gospel Through Darkness. Churachandpur, Manipur: Rev. Dr. Lalmuoklien. SMART tech Offset Printers, Churachandpur
 Ngurte, SN. 1991. Damlai Thlaler.
 Ngurte, SN. 1994. Rengchawnghawi.
 Ngurte, SN. 1995. Kanaan Phaizawl. HL Lawma & Sons Publication.
 Pudaite, Jonathan. 2011. The Legacy of Watkin R. Roberts.
 Pudaite, Mawii. 1982. Beyond The Next Mountain: The Story of Rochunga Pudaite. Tyndale House Publishers.
 Pudaite, Rochunga. 1985, The Dime That Lasted Forever. Carol Stream, Illinois: Tyndale House Publishers.
 Pudaite, Rochunga. 2008. English-Hmar Dictionary. Partnership Publishing House.
 Pudaite, Rochunga. 2011. Ka Hring Nun Vol-1. Thomson Press, Harayana.
 Pudaite, Rosiem. 2002. Indian National Struggle for Freedom and its Impact on the Mizo Movement (1935-1953 AD).
 Pulamte, John H. 2011. Hmar Bûngpui. Imphal, Manipur: Dr. John H. Pulamte. BCPW, Imphal.
 Ruolngul, Darsanglien. 2009. The Advance of the Gospel (Part One). Churachandpur, Manipur: Rev. Darsanglien Ruolngul. SMART * tech Offset Printers, Churachandpur.
 Ruolngul. Darsanglien. 2013. Kohran. Churachandpur, Manipur: ICI. Diamond Offset, Churachandpur.
 Sanate, Ngurthangkhum. 1984. Ngurte Pahnam Chanchin. Churachandpur, Manipur/
 Sawngate, Thangsawihmang. 2012. Hmangaina Parbâwr. Churachandpur, Manipur.
 Sinate, Lalthankhum. 2001. Kohran Hring.
 Thangsiem, JC. Zilsi Varzan. Rengkai, Churachandpur.
 Ṭhiek, Hrilrokhum. 2013. History of the Hmars in North East India, Guwahati, Assam: Rev. Hrilrokhum Ṭhiek, Bhabani Offset Private Ltd., Guwahati.
 Ṭhiek, Hrilrokhum. 1996. Maichâma Mei Chu Sukchawk Zing Ding A Nih.
 Thuomte, H. 2001. Joute Pahnam Inthladan (Joute Genealogy). Churachandpur, Manipur
 Various. 2008. Lal Remruot - Saidan Chanchin. Delhi. Hmanglien & Sons. Rai's Ad-venture, Delhi.
 Zaneisang, H. 2003. Sinlung. Churachandpur, Manipur: H. Zaneisang. Diamond Offset, Churachandpur.
 Zote, Timothy Z. 2007. Manmasi Year Book (Vol-II), Churachandpur, Manipur: Manmasi Year Book Editorial Board. BCPW, Imphal.
Sungte, Robert L. 2007. Impact of Religious Journals on the Hmar tribe in Manipur, Karnataka. Mangalore University, Mangalore.
 Varte, Immanuel Zarzosang. 2016. Revisiting Sikpui Ruoi of the Hmar Tribe. Anthropology Today. Vol. 1, No. 2. ISSN 2454-2709. Pp. 60–72.
 Varte, Immanuel Zarzosang. 2017. In Search of the “Holy” Confluence: A Journey to the Barak River. In: Queenbala Marak (Ed) “Doing Autoethnography”. Serials Publications: New Delhi. . Pp. 268–285.
 Varte, Immanuel Zarzosang & Lalthakim Hmar (ed). 2016. Highland Musing. 2016. IndigeNE: Imphal. .
 Varte, Immanuel Zarzosang & Lalthakim Hmar (ed). 2016. Sinlung Sermei. IndigeNE: Imphal. .
 Varte, Immanuel Zarzosang. 2014. Hmar at the Crossroads. IndigeNE: Imphal. .
 Varte, Immanuel Zarzosang. 2014. Culture and Development: Hmar of Tipaimukh in Transition. IndigeNE: Imphal. .
 Varte, Immanuel Zarzosang. 2019. Ruolevaisuo a Hohlimna Thusim Thlirletna. 2019. In: Nunhlui-II (Hmar MIL Textbook for TDC Third Semester), Assam University, Silchar, Hmar Literature Society, Assam.
 Varte, Immanuel Zarzosang. 2014.	Traditional concepts on honour, wealth, happiness and self-reliance vis-á-vis planned development: Case of the Hmars. In: Aheibam Koireng Singh, Amol Sanasam and Sushma Phurailatpam (Ed) “Knowing Manipur from Endogenous Perspective”. Centre for Manipur Studies, Manipur University and Indian Council of Social Science Research: Imphal. Vol. 2. . Pp. 451−460.
 Varte, Immanuel Zarzosang. 2011. Indigenous Knowledge System, Identity, Freedom and Tipaimukh Dam: An Anthropological Perspective. In: Lal Dena (Ed) “Dialogue on Tipaimukh Dam”. Akansha Publishing House: New Delhi. . Pp. 142−151.
 Varte, Immanuel Zarzosang & R. Th. Varte. 2017.	Hmar Traditional Practices in Conflict Resolution: An Anthropological Perspective. In: Melvil Pereira, Bitopi Dutta and Binita Kakati (Ed) “Legal Pluralism and Indian Democracy: Tribal Conflict Resolution Systems in Northeast India”. Routledge: New York. Print ; eText .
 Varte, Immanuel Zarzosang. 2005.	Pre-historical Heritage of Ruong Le Vaisuo. “Hmar Arasi”. Souvenir on the occasion of Cultural Festival-cum-Sikpui Ruoi, 2 – 5 December & 50th General Assembly-cum-Literary Meet, 15 – 16 December. Hmar Students' Association General Headquarters: Churachandpur. Pp. 96–99.

Notable people 
Rochunga Pudaite, included the Hmar as well as Paite, Zou, Vaiphei, Gangte, and other clans as one of the Schedule Tribe of India, 1956 and the founder of Bibles for the world 
HT Sangliana, Lok Sabha MP
Esther Hnamte, Singer
Mami Varte, Mizo singer
Jason Azzopardi
Lalnghinglova Hmar, Journalist and sports promoter of Mizoram
Lalremsiami, India women's national field hockey team player
Bijoy Kumar Hrangkhawl, Politician from Tripura
Lalram Luaha, Indian Footballer
Lal Dena, Hmar historian and Vice Chancellor of Sangai International University, Churachandpur
Lalthlamuong Keivom, writer and composer of Mizo literature and Hmar literature
Zirsangzela Hnamte, Writer of Mizo literature
Jamchonga Nampui, the first tribal Indian Administrative Services (IAS) officer in India.
Alfred Lalroutsang, youngest-ever player to play in the Indian Super League at the age of 16 years.
Lalrinliana Hnamte, Indian Footballer 
Lalvarmoi Hmar, Indian Footballer 
Hmar Zothanchhunga, Indian Cricketer

See also 
Bnei Menashe

References

External links 
VIRTHLI- Ushering Change (News & Info House of the Hmars)
INPUI.COM – News & Information 'House' of the Hmar Tribe
Hmarram.com: Hmar Online Museum
HMARHLA.COM – Hmar Lyrics
Hmasawnna Thar- A Hmar Daily
Jacob L Pulamte
Hmar Arasi – Official website of the Hmar Students' Association, Bangalore Branch
Sinlung
Hmar Resources Online: The Hmar Repository
Mumbai Tuisunsuo Weekly News
Hmar Clans
Hmar Dances
Hmar Books & Authors
Indian Catholic, Christian leaders gather warring ethnic groups for peace
The case for a Hmar Autonomous District Council in Mizoram
Hmar: Struggle for autonomy

+
Scheduled Tribes of Manipur
Headhunting
Scheduled Tribes of Meghalaya
Scheduled Tribes of Mizoram
Scheduled Tribes of Assam
Scheduled Tribes of Tripura
Ethnic groups in Northeast India
Ethnic groups in South Asia
Ethnic groups in Southeast Asia
Ethnic groups in Myanmar
Ethnic groups in Bangladesh